Ligia occidentalis is a species of rock slater in the family Ligiidae. L. occidentalis is a habitat generalist of rocky shores. It is found in North America and Mexico. The western sea slater (sometimes called the rock louse) is separated from L. pallasi by its much longer uropods and its larger eyes, set closer together along with its sleeker body. This species has a tendency to bolt when disturbed. These sea slaters hide in rocky crevices above the high tide line during the day. It may emerge at night or in cooler weather to scavenge for algae and detritus along beaches or rocky cliffs. Western sea slaters must keep their gills moist in order to breathe but they cannot survive long underwater and will drown.

References

Isopoda
Articles created by Qbugbot
Crustaceans described in 1853